USS Puerto Rico may refer to:

  was a planned  whose construction was canceled in 1943
  was the former name of a high speed ferry acquired by the U.S. Navy in 2012
  is a 

Puerto Rico